Dionisie Fotino (1769–1821) was a Wallachian historian and high ranking civil servant of Greek origin. 

Born in Patras, Fotinos (Photeinos, Gr. Φωτεινός ) hailed from the so-called Phanariote families within the Ottoman Empire. He moved to Wallachia in 1804.

Fotino was one of the first scholars to propose a Daco-Roman ancestry for the Romanians by stating, in his History of Old Dacia of 1818, that "the Romans and Dacians, crossbreeding, created a distinct, mixed people" in Dacia Traiana province.

References

Sources

1769 births
1821 deaths
Writers from Patras
Romanian people of Greek descent
Phanariotes
19th-century Greek historians
19th-century Romanian historians
Moldavian and Wallachian chroniclers